My Wonderful Wanda is a 2020 Swiss comedy drama film directed by Bettina Oberli. The film was shot in Zurich in 2019.

Plot
Polish woman Wanda comes to Switzerland to live with Josef and his wife Elsa after he suffered a stroke. They live in his villa by Lake Zürich.

Cast
Agnieszka Grochowska as Wanda
Marthe Keller as Elsa
André Jung as Josef
Birgit Minichmayr as Sophie
Jacob Matschenz as Gregi
Anatole Taubman as Manfred
 as Vizedirektor

Reception
On review aggregator Rotten Tomatoes, the film holds an approval rating of 71% based on 21 reviews, with an average rating of 7.1/10. On Metacritic, the film has a weighted average score of 54 out of 100, based on 8 critics, indicating "mixed or average reviews".

Sheri Linden of The Hollywood Reporter called the film an "Engagingly played", but also mentioned that "[it] runs out of satirical steam", while Alissa Simon of Variety liked the film for its well-acting and surprising twists.

Ann Hornaday of The Washington Post wrote: "Despite the sometimes rickety scaffolding they're asked to inhabit, all of the actors deliver honest, grounded performances".

Kristen Yoonsoo Kim of The New York Times had this to say about the film: "[My Wonderful Wanda] loses emotional momentum with each new section.

Accordimng to Gary Goldstein of the Los Angeles Times, the film is "Still, a busy third act that features... several other emotionally charged moments help close things out on a more affecting note".

References

External links

2020 comedy films
Swiss comedy films